Charles E. Baer (September 24, 1905 – May 31, 1987) was an American football coach.  He served as the head football coach at the University of Detroit Mercy for six seasons, from 1945 until 1950.  His coaching record at Detroit was 35–21–1.  Baer is a member of the Indiana Football Hall of Fame.

Baer was captain of his high school football team in Streator, Illinois, from which he graduated in 1923. He played college football at the University of Illinois at Urbana–Champaign as a guard.   The team won a Big Ten Conference title in 1927.

Head coaching record

College

References

1905 births
1987 deaths
American football guards
Detroit Titans football coaches
Illinois Fighting Illini football coaches
Illinois Fighting Illini football players
High school football coaches in Iowa
People from Streator, Illinois
Players of American football from Illinois